John Thomas McLure (1889 – ?) was a college football and baseball player who served in the First World War.

Auburn University
McClure was a prominent quarterback for Mike Donahue's Auburn Tigers of Auburn University.

1908
In 1908, a year in which he was captain, he was selected All-Southern;  Vanderbilt coach Dan McGugin describes his play: "McClure was not particularly fast, but a spirited leader, an excellent general and a sure tackler."  LSU won the SIAA championship, but amidst fears of many players being ineligible under SIAA rules most sportswriters did not include them for All-Southern selection. LSU rival Tulane, which was also undefeated in conference play, accused many LSU players of professionalism. Auburn is one team listed as an alternative southern champion, for LSU was its only loss.

World War I
McClure served in the First World War. He declared that going over the top in France beats charging into an opposing eleven. Such an attitude did eventually get him wounded.

References

American football quarterbacks
Auburn Tigers football players
All-Southern college football players
Players of American football from Alabama
People from Calhoun County, Alabama
1889 births
American military personnel of World War I
Year of death missing